West Virginia's 4th congressional district is an obsolete district existing from 1883 to 1993.  While the district's bounds were changed many times over the years, from the 1940 redistricting to the 1970 redistricting, the district was focused on Huntington and the industrial mill towns north of that city.  In the 1970 redistricting, the district focused on Huntington and the rural coal producing areas of southwestern West Virginia.  Today the state has only two districts, the 1st covering the southern half of the state, and the 2nd the northern half.

History
The 4th district was formed in 1882.  It originally consisted of Pleasants, Wood, Ritchie, Wirt, Calhoun, Jackson, Roane, Mason, Putnam, Cabell, Lincoln and Wayne counties.  In 1902, Tyler Braxton, Gilmer, and Doddridge were added, while Putnam, Cabell, Lincoln and Wayne were removed.  The district was totally reconstituted in 1916 as Tyler, Pleasants, Wood, Wirt, Jackson, Roane, Mason, Putnam, and Cabell counties.  In 1934, Wayne and Lincoln were added.  The district was unchanged for 1952.  In 1962, Logan was added.  In 1972, the district was totally reconstituted as Cabell, Logan, McDowell, Mercer, Mingo, Raleigh, Wayne and Wyoming counties.  The district was abolished in the 1992 redistricting.

List of representatives

References

 Congressional Biographical Directory of the United States 1774–present

Former congressional districts of the United States
04